There are two very different definitions of hot start commonly used in aviation - one for turbine based engines and one for reciprocating fuel injected engines.

Reciprocating fuel injected engines 

In an aircraft with a reciprocating fuel injected engine a hot start is a condition where an engine start is attempted after it has been run, achieved operating temperature, and then recently shut down. The engine is "hot" and hence the terminology hot start. When a reciprocating fuel injected engine is shut down, the residual engine heat dissipates into the air and the surrounding aircraft structure. Some of this heat is transferred to the engine fuel lines and fuel injector lines in the engine compartment and, because no fuel is flowing in the lines to cool them as would be under normal operating conditions, the fuel may vaporize or "boil" within these fuel lines creating a condition called vapor lock. This combination of liquid fuel and vaporized fuel within the fuel line will result in inconsistent fuel availability to the engine fuel pump and fuel injection system. If severe, the fuel pumps can "cavitate" (when the pumping chamber fills with fuel vapor rather than liquid fuel) and become ineffective. The vapor in the fuel lines and loss of fuel pump effectiveness result in inconsistent fuel flow to the engine fuel injectors and ultimately the cylinders resulting difficult starting. Vapor lock can also occur in flight in some aircraft resulting in a rough running engine or engine stoppage.

Unlike a turbine engine, a hot start is unlikely to damage a  reciprocating fuel injected engine. However, with improper starting procedure the situation may progress to the point that the operator depletes the starter battery before successfully starting the engine and there is risk of battery or starter damage, and certainly excess wear, due to these repeated unsuccessful attempts to start the engine.

On the ground a vapor lock condition in the fuel lines is merely an inconvenience however, in the air it becomes an emergency situation due to the difficulty in restarting the engine. Therefore, it is important that operators of reciprocating fuel injected engines switch fuel tanks prior to fuel exhaustion and to know and understand the hot start engine starting procedure. Most pilot operating handbooks for aircraft with reciprocating fuel injected engines describe specific procedures for starting the engine(s) after a recent shutdown while the engine is still "hot" in an attempt to avoid a vapor lock condition in the fuel feed lines or injector lines and enable a successful engine restart. Not all pilot operating handbooks use the hot start terminology to describe this procedure. As well, most pilot operating handbooks for aircraft susceptible to a vapor lock condition have a procedure for addressing vapor lock or "rough engine" if encountered in flight.

Turbine engines 

In contrast to reciprocating fuel injected engines, a hot start in a turbine type engine is the result of improper starting technique and not simply the condition of starting an engine which is hot due to having been recently run and shutdown.

In a jet engine - be it a pure jet, a turbofan or a turboprop - a great amount of the air ingested by the engine runs around the combustion chamber or around its flame, instead of being mixed with fuel and burned. The purpose of this air is to cool the combustion chambers and keep the temperature of the chamber within its limits. If it weren't for this cooling effect, the chamber would get too hot because of the combustion, and it would then be burned or even melted.

Regardless of the jet engine variant (pure jet, turbofan or turboprop), the engine's compressor must be already spinning before igniting the fuel, so as to have the compressors attain enough speed to draw air and make it flow through the engine. When there is a sufficient amount of air flowing, the fuel is injected, and then the engine will be able to run by itself.

The critical part is injecting the fuel. If the fuel is ignited before there is enough air flowing around the chamber, its temperature will increase dramatically and exceed the design limits of the combustion chamber and turbine blades, thus causing a failure. This condition is known as a hot start.

In some modern jet engines FADEC system prevents such condition from occurring. When FADEC is not present the flight crew has to monitor the engine parameters and manually shut off the fuel valve if the exhaust temperature exceeds its maximum allowed value.

References

Aircraft propulsion components